The Peel River (  in Gwich’in) is a tributary of the Mackenzie River in the Yukon and Northwest Territories in Canada. Its source is in the Ogilvie Mountains in the central Yukon at the confluence of the Ogilvie River and Blackstone River. Its main tributaries are:
Ogilvie River
Blackstone River
Hart River
Wind River (Yukon)
Bonnet Plume River
Snake River (Yukon)

The Peel River joins the Mackenzie in the Mackenzie Delta. However, a distributary of the Peel is the headwater for a channel that later collects distributaries of the Mackenzie. This means that a channel can be followed for a longer distance downriver until it, itself, disseminates into the shared delta. This arguably adds a greater length to the Peel River.

The Dempster Highway crosses it at Fort McPherson, via a ferry during the summer months and an ice bridge during the winter. The Peel River is a wilderness river and Fort McPherson is the only community along its banks. The Yukon part of the Peel Watershed is undergoing land use planning.

Steven Kokelj, a specialist in permafrost, has documented significant changes in the balance of dissolved ions in the river's water as the region's permafrost starts to melt.
Ions of elements like calcium and sulphur dissolve easily when the permafrost thaws.

See also
List of longest rivers of Canada
List of rivers of the Northwest Territories
List of rivers of Yukon

References

Rivers of the Northwest Territories
Rivers of Yukon
Hudson's Bay Company trading posts
Borders of Yukon
Borders of the Northwest Territories
Tributaries of the Mackenzie River